The 2009 Canadian Direct Insurance BC Men's Curling Championship (British Columbia's men's provincial curling championship) was held February 9-15 at the Golden Ears Winter Club in Maple Ridge, British Columbia. The winning team represented British Columbia at the 2009 Tim Hortons Brier in Calgary.

Teams

* Throws third stones

Standings

Results

Draw 1
February 9, 1200

Draw 2
February 9, 1900

Draw 3
February 10, 1200

Draw 4
February 10, 1900

Draw 5
February 11, 1200

Draw 6
February 11, 1900

Draw 7
February 12, 1200

Draw 8
February 12, 1900

Draw 9
February 13, 0900

Tiebreaker
February 13, 1430

Playoffs

1 vs. 2
February 13, 1900

3 vs. 4
February 14, 1300

Semi-final
February 14, 2000

Final
February 15, 1600

External links
Golden Ears Winter Club

Canadian Direct Insurance Bc Mens Provincials, 2009
Maple Ridge, British Columbia
2009 in British Columbia
Curling in British Columbia